Denis O'Connor (born 1947 in Auckland) is a New Zealand-based ceramicist, sculptor, and writer who has exhibited both in New Zealand and internationally.

Education 
O'Connor studied at the Wellington Polytechnic School of Design and the University of Otago.

Career 
O'Connor's early work was made using white porcelain and the iron-rich clay which he found near his studio on Waiheke Island.  In 1985 he was awarded the Frances Hodgkins Fellowship at Otago University, and during his tenure he switched to using limestone. More recently he has incorporated found objects and has started to use black slate, which has introduced a more minimalist aesthetic.

Residencies 
He has held international residencies including:

 Frances Hodgkins Fellowship, Otago University (1985)
 Moet and Chandon Fellowship, Champagne, France (1996)
 Rathcoola Fellowship, Cork, Ireland (2005)
 Blumhardt Foundation Residency in Gulgong, New South Wales, Australia (2016), (2017–18)

Public commissions and collections 
O'Connor has had many prestigious commissions, and his works are held in a large number of public collections including:

 Aotea Centre, Auckland
 Auckland Art Gallery Toi o Tāmaki
 Auckland Museum Te Papa Whakahiku
 Auckland Regional Authority
 Australia Council for the Arts, Sydney
 City Gallery, Wellington
 Connells Bay Sculpture Park
 Dowse Art Museum, Lower Hutt
 Dunedin Public Art Gallery
 Frances Hodgkins Fellowship Collection, University of Otago, Dunedin
 Govett-Brewster Art Gallery, New Plymouth
 Hocken Library, University of Otago, Dunedin
 Ministry of Foreign Affairs and Trade, Wellington
 Ministry of Justice, High Court, Auckland
 Ministry of Justice, High Court, Wellington
 Moët et Chandon, Épernay, France
 Montana Wines Ltd, New Zealand
 Museum of New Zealand Te Papa Tongarewa
 National Bank, Auckland
 National Gallery of Victoria, Melbourne
 National Maritime Museum, Auckland
 North Harbour Chapel, Albany, Auckland
 Rijksmuseum Kroller-Muller, Netherlands
  Robert McDougall Art Gallery, Christchurch
 Royal Scottish Museum, Edinburgh
 Sky City Casino, Auckland
 University of Auckland
 Viaduct Basin, Auckland
 Waikato Museum of Art and History, Hamilton
 Wairarapa Arts Foundation, Masterton
 Wellington City Council
 Wellington Sculpture Trust, Wellington Botanic Garden

Publications 
O'Connor has produced several written works to accompany his major exhibitions:

 Songs of the gulf 1984 
 The Gorse King 1992 
 Big aitche little aitche 2000 
 What the roof dreamt 2007

References 

1947 births
Living people
20th-century New Zealand sculptors
20th-century New Zealand male artists
21st-century New Zealand sculptors
21st-century New Zealand male artists
New Zealand ceramicists
People from Auckland
University of Otago alumni